William Herman Blackwell Jr. (born July 9, 1975) is a former American football player who played wide receiver for the Pittsburgh Steelers in the National Football League (NFL). Blackwell was picked in the second round of the 1997 NFL Draft with high expectations based on his successful career at San Diego State University, but he played sparingly in five years in the NFL. He now coaches the Skyline High School football team in Oakland, California.

College
Blackwell decided to attend San Diego State University.  Blackwell was WAC freshman of the year in 1994. Blackwell was Individual Statistical Leader with 86 catches and 1206 yards. Blackwell was coached by Dino Babers and Curtis Johnson. Blackwell was a 1000-yard receiver in 1996.  Blackwell's combine results were enough to get him to the NFL.

Blackwell was Freshman of the year, 1994 and first team Western Athletic Conference in 1995 and 1996.

College stats
Receiving and Rushing

Scoring

NFL

Career stats

Blackwell was part of The Bill Walsh NFL Minority Coaching Fellowship, an annual program administered by the NFL Management Council and NFL Player.  Blackwell was one of four interns hand picked.

Blackwell was only one of five Steelers to have returned kickoffs for touchdowns (JuJu Smith-Schuster in 2017, Antonio Brown in 2010, Allen Rossum in 2007, Antwaan Randle El in 2002 and Will Blackwell in 2000).  In 2001, Blackwell reinjured his left knee in Pittsburgh's 21-3 loss to Jacksonville. Coach Bill Cowher said Blackwell, who missed the first half of last year with a knee injury.  Blackwell along with four other LSU players were released August 28, 2012 in the first round of major cuts.

Blackwell spent one month with the St Louis Rams and was cut August 31, 2002.

Personal life
Blackwell lives in California.  Blackwell works for Oakland Unified School District. He is a Receiver Coach, Restorative Practice Facilitator and Assistant Athletic Director for McClymonds High School. Blackwell also is the Head Coach for Varsity Baseball and a Community relations liaison.

Blackwell is the African American Male Achievement Program Manager helping Oakland’s public schools fight to save black boys.

References



1975 births
Living people
American football return specialists
American football wide receivers
Pittsburgh Steelers players
San Diego State Aztecs football players
High school football coaches in California
People from Texarkana, Texas